Abolfazl Mohammadhassani (born 17 October 1997) is an Iranian football forward, who currently plays for Esteghlal in Persian Gulf Pro League.

References

1997 births
Living people
Esteghlal Khuzestan players
Esteghlal F.C. players
Iranian footballers
Association football forwards
People from Bushehr
21st-century Iranian people